John Henry Diehl (born May 1, 1950) is an American character actor. Noted for his work in avant-garde theater, Diehl has performed in more than 140 films and television shows, including Land of Plenty, Stripes, City Limits, Nixon, Jurassic Park III and the TV series Miami Vice, The Shield, and Point Pleasant.

Diehl has "largely avoided the typecasting that is an accepted part of most character actors' careers." He has been a member of The Actors Studio since 2004.

Early life
Diehl was born in Cincinnati, Ohio in 1950. His father, John A. Diehl, was a civil engineer, and his mother, Mary, was a social worker. Raised in a devoutly Roman Catholic family, he was educated at parochial schools, and graduated from St. Xavier High School in 1968.

Career
In 1970, Diehl moved to New York, encouraged by his sister, who had just graduated from the Neighborhood Playhouse School of the Theatre. He spent 1971 squatting in Amsterdam and returned to New York in 1972. In 1976, he moved to Los Angeles. He had always been interested in drawing and making things, and intended to pursue a career in the visual arts there. Initially he supported himself in LA by moving furniture and objet d'art.

Although he had no previous experience as an actor, Diehl's interest turned to acting after he arrived in Los Angeles. He took a three-hour scene studies class in Hollywood twice a week, and in 1979 he was cast in Action, a one act play written by Sam Shepard. In 1980, he became an acting member of Murray Mednick's Padua Hills Playwrights Festival, an annual event which brought young playwrights from throughout the United States together to live and work with such playwrights as Mednick, Shepard, Maria Irene Fornes, John O’Keefe, John Steppling, and Robert Glaudini. Diehl worked with all of the playwrights in residence over the course of his several years as an acting member of the festival.

Diehl's first significant film role was in the 1981 movie Stripes. In the 25th Anniversary DVD release of Stripes, John Laroquette compared the improvisation of John Candy and Diehl to the improvisation of Stan Laurel and Oliver Hardy. In 1983, Diehl appeared in National Lampoon's Vacation, which Harold Ramis directed.

In 1984, Diehl was cast as Detective Larry Zito in Miami Vice. Diehl found the role unfulfilling, and decided to leave. On January 9, 1987 — the 57th episode of Miami Vice — Diehl made his last appearance in a two-part episode, "Down for the Count", in which his character was killed off.

Diehl moved into a basement apartment in Greenwich Village in New York, and despite a drastic reduction in his income, he declined television roles, and chose instead to continue working in film while pursuing a serious stage career. He subsequently appeared in The Hanoi Hilton (1987), a film about the experiences of American prisoners of war in Hanoi in the 1960s/70s, and Alex Cox's Walker (1987), which was shot in Nicaragua during the Contra War. In late 1988, Diehl relocated to Los Angeles after he was cast in Sam Shepard's A Lie of the Mind at the Mark Taper Forum.

He continued to work in theater in New York, however, and frequently returned to the stage there, most notably for a Shepherd play at the Public Theater with Shepard in residence at the Signature, and Mednick's Joe And Betty, which was produced twice on Theater Row in New York.

In 1997, Diehl reprised his role in Action at the Public Theater, and in 2005 he worked once again with Padua Playwrights, appearing in two plays in Mednick's Gary Trilogy. Among others, his theater credits include Life of Mine, (with Holly Hunter) at the Mark Taper Forum, Samuel Beckett's Endgame and Happy Days, one of three plays which Diehl directed.

He has appeared in more than 140 films, including Joysticks (1983), Angel (1984), City Limits (1984), Madhouse (1990), The Dark Side of the Moon (1990), Kickboxer 2 (1991), Mikey (1992), Mo' Money (1992), Gettysburg (1993), The Client (1994), Stargate (1994), The New Age (1994), Mind Ripper (1995), A Time to Kill (1996), Pearl Harbor (2001), and Road to Nowhere (2010).

He played G. Gordon Liddy in Oliver Stone's Nixon (1995), the mercenary Cooper in Jurassic Park III (2001), and in recurring roles on The Shield, Friday Night Lights, The West Wing and The John Larroquette Show. In 2000, he appeared in Fail Safe, which aired live on television. Between 2002 and 2004, he portrayed General Motors' Harley Earl in a series of television commercials for Buick. The commercials were directed by Tony Scott, who had previously directed films including Top Gun and Crimson Tide.

In 2004, Wim Wenders cast Diehl as the male lead in Land of Plenty, a film about post 9/11 American life. Shot on digital video in sixteen days, the film centered on Diehl's character, Paul, a troubled Vietnam veteran, and his niece, played by Michelle Williams. In a New York Times review of the film, A.O. Scott wrote that Diehl gave a "wry, cunning performance, allowing glimmers of Paul's intelligence and decency to shine through even in his moments of high self-delusion."

A member of the Actors Studio since 2004, Diehl won the Los Angeles Times Warren Award in 2012, and in 2014 won the Southampton Film Festival's Lead Actor Award for his role in the short film Kahea.

Personal life
Diehl and singer Julie Christensen were married in 1992. They live in Nashville, Tennessee, and have one son, Magnus Jackson Diehl.

He boxed as a middleweight in two professional matches (one win and one loss), and participated in several exhibition shows for charity.

Filmography

Film

Television

References

External links

1950 births
American male film actors
American male television actors
American Roman Catholics
Living people
Male actors from Cincinnati
St. Xavier High School (Ohio) alumni